Loversall is a civil parish in the metropolitan borough of Doncaster, South Yorkshire, England.  The parish contains five listed buildings that are recorded in the National Heritage List for England.  Of these, two are listed at Grade II*, the middle of the three grades, and the others are at Grade II, the lowest grade.  The parish contains the village of Loversall and the surrounding area.  All the listed buildings are in the village, and consist of a church, a tomb chest and a grave slab in the churchyard, a dovecote, and a country house.


Key

Buildings

References

Citations

Sources

 

Lists of listed buildings in South Yorkshire
Buildings and structures in the Metropolitan Borough of Doncaster